Charles Natali Mendonça Ayres (born 22 December 1963), known as Charles Guerreiro, is a Brazilian retired footballer who played as a right back, and is the manager of Imperatriz.

Honours

Player
Paysandu
Campeonato Paraense: 1985, 1987, 2000

Flamengo
Campeonato Carioca: 1991
Copa Rio: 1991
Campeonato Brasileiro Série A: 1992

Manager
Paysandu
Campeonato Paraense: 2010

Paragominas
Taça Estado do Pará: 2013

References

External links

1963 births
Living people
Sportspeople from Belém
Brazilian footballers
Association football defenders
Campeonato Brasileiro Série A players
Paysandu Sport Club players
Associação Atlética Ponte Preta players
Guarani FC players
CR Flamengo footballers
CR Vasco da Gama players
Fluminense FC players
Olaria Atlético Clube players
Clube do Remo players
Brazil international footballers
Brazilian football managers
Campeonato Brasileiro Série C managers
Campeonato Brasileiro Série D managers
Clube do Remo managers
Cardoso Moreira Futebol Clube managers
Paysandu Sport Club managers
Tuna Luso Brasileira managers